Sita Camara (born 11 March 1974) is a Guinean footballer who played as a defender. He played in three matches for the Guinea national football team from 1994 to 1996. He was also named in Guinea's squad for the 1994 African Cup of Nations tournament.

References

1974 births
Living people
Place of birth missing (living people)
Guinean footballers
Guinea international footballers
1994 African Cup of Nations players
Association football defenders
El Qanah FC players
Egyptian Premier League players
Guinean expatriate footballers
Expatriate footballers in Egypt
Guinean expatriate sportspeople in Egypt